Ferdinand Janner (4 February 1836 – 1 November 1895) was a German theologian from Hirschau in the Upper Palatinate.

Biography
Janner completed his schooling at the Latin school of Amberg. After his graduation there, he studied theology at Würzburg and Regensburg, He was ordained a priest on 13 August 1858.

For a time, Janner worked as a parish priest, but he eventually returned to the University of Würzburg, where he received his Doctor of Theology. Thereafter, he served first as the chaplain at Weiden, then in 1863, he became the prefect of the Regensburg seminary. In 1865, Janner became Professor of Religion and History at Speyer's gymnasium and, in 1867, Professor of Ecclesiastical History, Christian Archaeology, and History of Art at the Regensburg lyceum. Finally, in 1883, he became the diocesan consultor. Janner retired from active life in 1888 and died seven years later.

Selected works
Janner wrote many works in both German and Latin, including:
Geschichte der Bischofe von Regensburg, in three volumes 
De factis dogmaticis 
Infallibilem ecclesiam Catholicam esse in diiudicandis factis dogmaticis
Das officium unius martyris de communi in seinem Zusammenhang erklart 
Das Heilige Land, und die heiligen Statten, ein Pilgerbuch 
Missale parvun sive Missale Romanum in breviorem et commodiorem formam redactum
Die Bauhutten des deutschen Mittelaters 
Nicolas von Weis, Bischof zu Speyer 
Die Schotten in Regensburg, die Kirsche zu St. Jacob und deren Nordportal 
Das romische Brevier in deutscher Sprache, in four volumes
Personen-und Sachregister zu Rass, Die Con vertiten seit der Reformation, I-X

1836 births
1885 deaths
People from Amberg-Sulzbach
19th-century German Roman Catholic priests
19th-century German Catholic theologians
University of Würzburg alumni
19th-century German male writers
German male non-fiction writers